Jehan is a male given name. It is the old orthography of Jean in Old French, and is rarely given anymore. It is also a variant of the Persian name Jahan in some South Asian languages.

People with the given name Jehan  
 Jehan Adam (15th century), French mathematician
 Jehan Alain (1911–1940), French organist and composer
 Jahanara Begum (1614–1681), Mughal (Indian) royalty sometimes known as Jehan Begum
 Jehan Cauvin (1509–1564), French theologian and founder of Calvinism better known as John Calvin
 Jehan Cousin the Younger (circa 1522–1595), French artist
 Jehan Daruvala (born 1998), Indian racing driver
 Jehan de Lescurel (died 1304), medieval poet and composer also known as Jehannot de l'Escurel
 Jehan de Vezelay, birth name of Johannes of Jerusalem (1042–1119), French abbot
 Jehan de Waurin (circa 1400–1474), French chronicler
 Jehan Fresneau (fl. ca. 1468–1505), French composer
 Jehan Mubarak (born 1981), American-born Sri Lankan cricketer
 Jehan Rictus (1867–1933), French poet
 Jehan Sadat (1933–2021), first lady of Egypt
 Jehan Ara Saeed (1926–2007), Pakistani radio newsreader
 Jehan Tabourot (1519–1595), Catholic priest better known by his pen name Thoinot Arbeau
 Jehan Titelouze (c. 1562/63–1633), French organist and composer
 Jehan Georges Vibert (1840–1902), French academic painter
 Jehan Wali (21st century), Pakistani extrajudicial prisoner of the United States

Fictional character
 Jehan Frollo, a character in Victor Hugo's The Hunchback of Notre Dame

People with the surname Jehan 
 Noor Jehan (1926–2000), Pakistani film singer
 Sonya Jehan (21st century), Pakistani Bollywood actress

People with the nickname Jehan 
 Jehan (singer) (born 1957), French songwriter and singer
 Jean (Jehan) Prouvaire, a character in Victor Hugo's novel Les Misérables

See also 

 
 Jehanne (disambiguation)
 Jean (male given name)
 Jahan (name)